Childhood Memories may refer to:
Childhood Memories (song), a British Sea Power single
Childhood Memories (book), the memoirs of Romanian author Ion Creangă
Souvenirs d'enfance, an autobiographical cycle by French novelist Marcel Pagnol